Papillaria crocea is a species of moss. It may be seen as an epiphyte in moist Australian forests.

References

Flora of Australia
Hypnales